Gobardanga Hindu College, established in 1947, is a general degree college in Gobardanga, West Bengal, India. It offers undergraduate courses in arts, commerce and sciences and postgraduate courses in arts. It is currently affiliated to West Bengal State University (formerly affiliated to University of Calcutta). In 2016, it was reaccredited grade A by the National Assessment and Accreditation Council (NAAC) for the second successive time.

History
The college started to function formally with the departments of English, Bengali, Sanskrit, History, Logic, Elements of Civics and Economics, Mathematics, Commerce, Chemistry, Physics, Biology to the I.Sc. Standard with 105 students and 4 full-time teachers on 27 November 1947. BA and B.Sc course was introduced in 1950 and 1952 respectively. NCC was introduced in the College in 1956. Three teachers namely Niren Bandopadhyay, Sachindra Mohan Mukhopadhyay and Ambarnath Ghoshal went Fort William to learn all about NCC. Bengali Honours was introduced in the college curriculum in 1957. Department of B.Ed was established On 1 July 1962. Considering the importance of career oriented courses, Department of Travel and Tourism Management was introduced in 1998. In 2005, the college was accredited with grade A by the NAAC. General course of Botany, Zoology, Geography, Music, Journalism and Mass Communication, Computer Science, Physical education and General courses of Sociology and Anthropology introduced in the 2012 and 2013 respectively. In 2016, it was reaccredited grade A by the National Assessment and Accreditation Council (NAAC) for the second successive time. Honours courses of Anthropology, Botany, Zoology, Computer Science, Geography, Music, Journalism and Mass Communication introduced in 2018.

Departments

Under Graduation

Arts and Commerce

 Bengali
 English
 History
 Political Science
 Philosophy
 Sanskrit
 Geography
 Philosophy
 Education
 Physical education
 Music
 Economics
 Accountancy

Science
 Mathematics
 Physics
 Chemistry
 Botany
 Zoology
 Anthropology

Post Graduation
 Bengali
 Education
 History

Career-oriented courses

 Tourism & Travel Management.
 Journalism & Mass Communication.

Accreditation
Gobardanga Hindu College is recognized by the University Grants Commission (UGC). It was accredited by the National Assessment and Accreditation Council (NAAC). The college is awarded A grade by the NAAC.

Facilities

 Radio-frequency identification (RFID) enabled advanced library. 
 The Library has a total collection of about 35,000 documents which includes books, serials and non-book materials as well. The Library subscribes to Ten printed periodicals of different categories.
 Reading room with air conditioning and desktop access facility.
 Open library access.
 Sound system enabled classroom.
 Virtual and smart classroom.
 Scholarship for students achieving first class grade (60%) in the university examination.
 Free studentship for economically poor students.
 Regular online feedback system.
 One boy's hostel and two well decorated women's hostel buildings for the accommodation of boys and girls students.
 Bus service.
 Gymnasium

 Students' canteen.
 WiFi access.
 Purified drinking water.
 History Museum

Exhibition, annual sports and cultural competition
Exhibition is held every year in the college premises. Those models are prepared by the students with guidance from their teachers. All departments take part in it. Temporary stalls are built to accommodate exhibits of every department. Annual Sports and Cultural Competitions are also held every year which allows students to showcase their skills in various activities.

See also
Education in India
List of colleges in West Bengal
Education in West Bengal

References

External links

Gobardanga Hindu College

Educational institutions established in 1947
Colleges affiliated to West Bengal State University
Universities and colleges in North 24 Parganas district
1947 establishments in West Bengal
Hindu universities and colleges